The 2012 Women's European Championship or "European Cup" was the 17th annual rugby tournament organised by FIRA for the continent's national teams and the ninth official continental championship. Only eight teams took part - the lowest entry since 1996 and also the first time since 1996 that Scotland, Wales and Ireland did not take part. The leading four teams played in Group A in Rovereto, Italy between 13 and 19 May, and the other four played at Enköping between 3 and 7 May. The latter tournament also started Europe's Women's Rugby World Cup qualification process, with both finalists qualifying for the continent's qualification tournament in 2013.

Most of the absences were due to Unions prioritising sevens rugby, in advance of the 2013 Sevens World Cup. Even the teams attending the Group A tournament were weakened by clashes with the London, Amsterdam and Rome Sevens tournaments. England were least affected as their players only missed the first round of games, but several French players from the Six Nations did not play in this tournament, while most of the Spanish team from 2011 Women's European Trophy were selected for the Amsterdam Sevens in preference to Rovereto.

Group A

Group B
Semi finals

Third-place

Final

See also
Women's international rugby union

Notes

External links
FIRA website

Women's European
2012
International women's rugby union competitions hosted by Italy
International rugby union competitions hosted by Sweden
2011–12 in European women's rugby union
2011–12 in English rugby union
2011–12 in French rugby union
2011–12 in Italian rugby union
2012 in Spanish women's sport
2012 in English women's sport
2012 in French women's sport
2012 in Italian women's sport
2012 in Swedish women's sport